Hà Thị Hoa (born May 16, 1984) is a member of the Vietnam women's national volleyball team.

Clubs 
  Thông tin Liên Việt Post Bank (1999-2001)
  Vietinbank VC (2005-2019)

Awards

Individuals 
2009 VTV Binh Dien International Cup "Best Setter"
2011 VTV Binh Dien International Cup "Best Setter"
2012 VTV Binh Dien International Cup "Best Setter"

Clubs 
 2006 Vietnam League -  Bronze medal, with Vietinbank VC
 2007 Vietnam League -  Bronze medal, with Vietinbank VC
 2011 Vietnam League -  Bronze medal, with Vietinbank VC
 2012 Vietnam League -  Runner-Up, with Vietinbank VC
 2013 Vietnam League -  Runner-Up, with Vietinbank VC
 2014 Vietnam League -  Bronze medal, with Vietinbank VC
 2015 Vietnam League -  Runner-Up, with Vietinbank VC
 2016 Vietnam League -  Champion, with Vietinbank VC

References

Vietnamese women's volleyball players
1984 births
Living people
People from Haiphong
Vietnam women's international volleyball players
Southeast Asian Games silver medalists for Vietnam
Southeast Asian Games medalists in volleyball
Competitors at the 2007 Southeast Asian Games
Setters (volleyball)
21st-century Vietnamese women